Rognano is a comune (municipality) in the Province of Pavia in the Italian region Lombardy, located about  southwest of Milan and about  northwest of Pavia.

Rognano borders the following municipalities: Battuda, Casarile, Giussago, Trovo, Vellezzo Bellini, Vernate.

Demographic evolution

References

External links
 www.comune.rognano.pv.it/

Cities and towns in Lombardy